Miro Kocuvan (born 16 July 1947) is a Yugoslav sprinter. He competed in the men's 4 × 400 metres relay at the 1972 Summer Olympics.

References

1947 births
Living people
Athletes (track and field) at the 1972 Summer Olympics
Yugoslav male sprinters
Olympic athletes of Yugoslavia
Place of birth missing (living people)